Florisvaldo de Oliveira (November 18, 1958 – September 26, 2012), commonly known as "Cabo Bruno", was a Brazilian vigilante, serial killer and former officer of the Military Police of São Paulo State accused of more than 50 murders on the outskirts of São Paulo during the 1980s. Considered "one of the most controversial characters in the police chronicle", he initially admitted these deaths, but later denied them in his testimony.

Biography 
Florisvaldo de Oliveira was born in Uchoa in São Paulo State. The nickname "Cabo Bruno" came from his childhood in Catanduva, a provocation from his friends comparing him to a local alcoholic called Bruno. Even his mother began to call him just like that. Cabo Bruno was known as a vigilante, a person that kills for self perceived justice, usually in the outskirts. It was said that he killed "for hating the fringes", although testimonials suggested that some executions were motivated by the victims' appearance.

He acted almost always in his spare time, in the district of Jabaquara, and some residents said that "in his time there was so much insecurity." Traders were allegedly his biggest "customers", but he denied that. José Aparecido Benedito was the only survivor of Cabo Bruno's murders: after being shot, he pretended to be dead and managed to escape. Reports from journalist Caco Barcellos made him notorious, as it was he who covered the criminal's last imprisonment for the Jornal Nacional. Most of the shootings that he was charged with took place in 1982, and many bodies riddled with bullets found in the region during that year caused panic. The cars he used—a Chevrolet Chevette, Ford Maverick and a Chevrolet Impala—whose colors were always changed, also elevated his fame.

He was arrested for the first time on September 22, 1983 by court order, after being accused of more than twenty murders (being recognized by several witnesses), although he confessed to only one: on February 6, 1982, in the slum of Jardim Selma, where he was denounced by a friend of the victim, who survived. Many years later he would admit to about twenty murders, and according to his second wife: "The other [victims] put it on my account. There were people who killed and presented themselves as Cabo Bruno." According to her, he assumed, "it would not make much difference." At that time, São Paulo Military Police estimated that Cabo Bruno and at least twelve police officers, including two high officials (a captain and a lieutenant), would be responsible for several executions in the city's South Zone. Police further reported that many of the executions would have been made based solely on the victim's appearance, including a boy killed because of a small cross tattooed on his wrist—to Cabo Bruno, any tattoo would indicate a criminal, according to his religious reasoning. By the time the investigations began, the gang was apparently protected by the higher ranks, but the advance gathering of evidence and clues led to the whole corporation's collapse.

After 12 trials—in one of them, several other police officers went to court to press, but the evidence was aplenty—Cabo Bruno was sentenced to 113 years in prison. After fleeing three times, the last time on May 30, 1991, he was detained at the José Augusto César Salgado Penitentiary in Tremembé. He claimed to have become an evangelical and said he preferred not to be called Bruno. In 1998, an exhibition of oils on acrylic painted by him was held in São Paulo. In July 2008, as a pastor in the ecumenical chapel of the prison, he married there to a housewife who did volunteer work. In his work as a pastor, Lindemberg Alves became one of his followers.

Liberation and death 
In 2009, after completing one sixth of his sentence, he requested the conversion to a semi-open regime. The State Public Ministry requested a criminological psychosocial examination, done in two stages and with favorable opinions to the progression of the sentence, which was granted on August 19.

Despite the semi-open regime, that year he was denied the benefit of temporary leave, which he could only have as of 2017, because of his history of escaping. However, on August 22, 2012, the Taubaté court granted him his freedom after 27 years' imprisonment. In addition to the opinion of the prosecutor, which was based on a law providing for the definitive release of prisoners with good behavior and imprisonment for more than twenty years, documents with praise from officials and from P2's own management regarding his conduct in prison, unitarily strengthened the decision. He plasticized the original release license and always carried a copy with him, along with a list of ten dreams that he would like to accomplish before he died. "In my escape, they [the police] would always stop me," he complained, jokingly. "Now that I have the license, no one will stop me."

Just over a month after leaving prison, Cabo Bruno was killed with eighteen or twenty shots in the neighborhood Quadra Coberta, in Pindamonhangaba, around 11:30 pm on September 26, 2012. He was returning from a religious service in the municipality of Aparecida accompanied by relatives, when he was gunned down by two men; his relatives were unharmed. "According to witnesses, it was two men who arrived on foot and only shot at him," explained the lieutenant of the 2nd Company of the 5th Battalion of the Military Police. "It was probably an execution, but it will now be up to the Civil Police to investigate." As he was declared dead at the scene, Bruno was not taken to a hospital; crime scene experts collected shell casings from a .40 Smith & Wesson and another weapon, a .38 automatic Colt pistol.

After Cabo Bruno's death, his family auctioned off a number of paintings by the ex-PM in order to restart life elsewhere.

See also 
 List of serial killers by country
 List of serial killers by number of victims

Notes

References 

1958 births
2012 deaths
Brazilian murder victims
Brazilian people convicted of murder
Brazilian serial killers
Deaths by firearm in Brazil
Male serial killers
Murdered serial killers
Serial killers who worked in law enforcement
Vigilantes
People from Catanduva